Rebecca Sinclair is an American author of twelve historical romance novels.

According to Romantic Times, Sinclair "has a skillful way with characters and some of her supporting cast members were so interesting they deserve books of their own. "

Works 
 California Caress (1989)
 Passion's Wild Delight (1990)
 Prairie Angel (1990)
 Wild Scottish Embrace (1991)
 Montana Wildfire (1991)
 Forbidden Desires (1992)
 Scottish Ecstasy (1993)
 Sweet Texas Kiss (1994)
 Forevermore (1995)
 Perfect Strangers (1996)
 Golden Dreams (1997)
 Heart's Whisper (1998)
 Murphy's Law (1999)
 Murphy's Law (reprint) (2009)

References

External links 
 http://www.rebeccasinclair.com

Living people
20th-century American novelists
American romantic fiction writers
American women novelists
20th-century American women writers
Year of birth missing (living people)
21st-century American women